Susanna "Suski" Tapani (born 2 March 1993) is a Finnish multi-sport elite athlete who competes in ice hockey, ringette, and in-line hockey. She is a member of the Finnish national ice hockey team and Finnish national ringette team. Tapani was team captain for Finland's 2022 World Ringette Championships senior team which won gold.

Tapani is the subject of a Finnish documentary,  ('Icebreaker'), which follows her life as she competes in elite ringette, ice hockey, and in-line hockey from 2015 to 2019.

Education 
Tapani studied sports management at the Turku University of Applied Sciences.

Ice hockey career 
Tapani has played ice hockey in Finland, Sweden, USA, and Russia.
Tapani played ice hockey in Finland in the Naisten Liiga with TPS Naiset, Lukko Naiset, Espoo Blues Naiset, and HPK Kiekkonaiset. In Sweden, Tapani played in the Swedish Women's Hockey League (SDHL) with Linköping HC Dam. In the USA Tapani played with the North Dakota Fighting Hawks women's ice hockey program during the 2013–14 NCAA Division I women's ice hockey season. In Russia Tapani played professional ice hockey in the Russian Zhenskaya Hockey League (ZhHL) with the KRS Vanke Rays during the later part of the 2021–22 ZhHL season.

Training
Tapani trained with several men's professional ice hockey players during the extended pause between the 2019–20 and 2020–21 seasons due to COVID-19. Under the direction of Ismo Lehkonen, the group – which included NHLers Kaapo Kakko, Artturi Lehkonen, Mikko Rantanen, and Rasmus Ristolainen, and several Liiga players – trained on the ice together for two hours a day. Jonne Virtanen, long-time Liiga player and member of the training group, noted that Tapani's  strength and toughness would be well suited to a style of play that permitted checking and enthused, "Suski is the best female player that I have ever seen."

During the 2019–20 and 2020–21 seasons, Tapani played with the TPS Juniorijääkiekko men's under-18 (U18) team, known as TPS U18 Akatemia, of the U18 Mestis/U18 Suomi-sarja until scheduling conflicts forced her to choose between ringette and ice hockey in November 2020. Regarding the situation, Tapani stated, "I’m not commenting on the discussions [with TPS] or the way this came to be, but combining the two sports didn’t fit when there were too many overlapping games."

International play 
Tapani made three appearances with the Finnish women's national under-18 ice hockey team at the IIHF Women's World U18 Championship, in 2009, 2010, and 2011, winning a bronze medal at the 2011 tournament.

As of 2020, Tapani ranks sixth in all-time points scored with the Finnish women's national team, tallying 75 goals and 72 assists for 147 points in 179 top division matches. She has represented Finland at every IIHF Women's World Championship since 2011, except the 2016 tournament. At the 2017 IIHF Women's World Championship, she was Finland’s leading scorer and ranked fifth for scoring in the tournament overall with 3 goals and 6 assists for 9 points in 5 games.

Tapani has also competed with the Finnish national team at the Winter Olympic Games, debuting in the women's ice hockey tournament at the 2014 Winter Olympics in Sochi. Though Finland suffered their worst Olympic placement in team history, finishing in fifth place, Tapani saw individual success and tied teammate Riikka Välilä for third rank on the Finnish scoring list, with 1 goal and 4 assists for 5 points in six games. In the women's ice hockey tournament at the 2018 Winter Olympics in Pyeongchang, Finland won bronze and Tapani finished fourth in the team’s scoring ranks, with 2 goals and 3 assists for 5 points in six games. The women's ice hockey tournament at the 2022 Winter Olympics in Beijing saw Tapani take another step in offensive production, ranking first on the team in scoring with 6 goals and 2 assists for 8 points in seven games, and leading Finland to another bronze medal victory.

In 2021, Finnish national ice hockey team head coach Pasi Mustonen called Tapani the team’s best forward among a roster which also included internationally recognized forwards Michelle Karvinen  and Petra Nieminen.

Career statistics

Regular season and playoffs  
Note: Italics indicate postseason relegation series; statistics not included in playoff totals.

International

Source:

Ringette career 
Tapani began playing ringette as a child. At the international level of competition, Tapani has served as the captain of the Senior Finland national ringette team. SM Ringette is Finland's semi-professional ringette league and is also its top elite ringette league.

International play 
Tapani played ringette for Team Finland Junior at the 2009 World Junior Ringette Championships (U19) and the 2012 World Junior Ringette Championships. She has also played for Team Finland Senior at the World Ringette Championships in 2010, 2016, 2017, and 2019, winning gold at each tournament.

  5x winner of World Ringette Championship titles and the Sam Jacks Trophy
  Winning team at the first World Junior Ringette Championships (U19)
 MVP for 2022 World Ringette Championships

References

External links
 
 
 

1993 births
Living people
People from Laitila
Finnish women's ice hockey forwards
Ringette players
Shenzhen KRS Vanke Rays players
Linköping HC Dam players
TPS Naiset players
Lukko Naiset players
Espoo Blues Naiset players
HPK Kiekkonaiset players
North Dakota Fighting Hawks women's ice hockey players
Ice hockey players at the 2014 Winter Olympics
Ice hockey players at the 2018 Winter Olympics
Ice hockey players at the 2022 Winter Olympics
Medalists at the 2018 Winter Olympics
Medalists at the 2022 Winter Olympics
Olympic bronze medalists for Finland
Olympic ice hockey players of Finland
Olympic medalists in ice hockey
Finnish expatriate ice hockey players in Sweden
Finnish expatriate ice hockey players in Russia
Finnish expatriate ice hockey players in the United States
Sportspeople from Southwest Finland